Kahrizak (also Romanized as Kahrīzak; also known as Kahrīzak-e Mandekān) is a village in Karimabad Rural District, Sharifabad District, Pakdasht County, Tehran Province, Iran. At the 2006 census, its population was 338, in 85 families.

References 

Populated places in Pakdasht County